There have been three ships with the name USS Rainier that saw service in the United States Navy:

, a schooner in commission as a patrol vessel from 1917 to 1919
, an ammunition ship in commission from 1941 to 1946 and from 1951 to 1970
, a fast combat support ship commissioned in 1995, decommissioned in 2003, and transferred to the Military Sealift Command as USNS Rainier (T-AOE-7).

See also
  is an oceanographic survey ship operated by the National Oceanic and Atmospheric Administration. She was launched in 1967.
 SS Rainier (T2-SE-A1) a World War II commercial T2 tanker completed on 24 March 1944, by Swan Island. After World War II she was sold to a private company in 1948. Converted to bulker cargo ship in 1962. Was wrecked and lost in 1965.

United States Navy ship names